The following location in County Kerry lacks monastic connection:
 Ardfert Abbey: Georgian mansion, home of the Crosbie family, destroyed by IRA bomb 1922

Notes

References

See also
List of monastic houses in Ireland

Kerry
Monastic houses
Monastic houses
Monastic houses